The Lucy Gray Mountains are a mountain range in Clark County, Nevada. Beer Bottle Pass is at the northern end of the range, east of Roach Lake.

References 

Mountain ranges of Clark County, Nevada
Mountain ranges of Nevada